Concealed is the full-length debut album by the Canadian progressive death metal band Augury. It was released on September 14, 2004 through Galy Records.

Track listing

Personnel
Augury
 Arianne Fleury - soprano and choir voices
 Patrick Loisel – Main vocals, electric guitar, 12-string acoustic guitar
 Mathieu Marcotte – electric guitar, 12-string acoustic guitar
 Dominic (Forest) Lapointe – 4-string fretless bass, 6-string bass
 Étienne Gallo – drums

Production
 Yannick St-Amand - recording, mixing
 Jean-Francois Dagenais - recording, mixing
 Bernard Belley - mastering

2004 albums
Augury (band) albums
Galy Records albums